Anulavirus is a genus of viruses, in the family Bromoviridae. Pelargonium serve as natural hosts. There are two species in this genus.

Taxonomy
The following species are assigned to the genus:
 Amazon lily mild mottle virus
 Pelargonium zonate spot virus

Structure
Viruses in the genus Anulavirus have icosahedral and  Quasi-spherical geometries, and T=3 symmetry. The diameter is around 25-35 nm. Genomes are linear and segmented, tripartite.

Life cycle
Viral replication is cytoplasmic. Entry into the host cell is achieved by penetration into the host cell. Replication follows the positive stranded RNA virus replication model. Positive stranded rna virus transcription, using the internal initiation model of subgenomic rna transcription is the method of transcription. The virus exits the host cell by tubule-guided viral movement. Pelargonium serve as the natural host. Transmission routes are mechanical.

References

External links
 ICTV Report: Bromoviridae
 Viralzone: Anulavirus

Bromoviridae
Virus genera